is a Japanese triathlete. She won a gold medal in the Girls' Triathlon event at the 2010 Summer Youth Olympics.

References

1992 births
Living people
Japanese female triathletes
Triathletes at the 2010 Summer Youth Olympics
Sportspeople from Chiba Prefecture
Asian Games medalists in triathlon
Triathletes at the 2014 Asian Games
Triathletes at the 2018 Asian Games
Asian Games gold medalists for Japan
Triathletes at the 2016 Summer Olympics
Olympic triathletes of Japan
Medalists at the 2014 Asian Games
Medalists at the 2018 Asian Games
Youth Olympic gold medalists for Japan
20th-century Japanese women
21st-century Japanese women